Staro Petrovo Selo railway station is a railway station on Novska–Tovarnik railway in Croatia. Located in Staro Petrovo Selo. Railroad continued to Nova Gradiška in one and the other direction to Nova Kapela–Batrina. Staro Petrovo Selo railway station consists of 4 railway track.

See also 
 Croatian Railways
 Zagreb–Belgrade railway

References 

Railway stations in Croatia
Buildings and structures in Brod-Posavina County